Jane Jacobs (1916–2006) was an American-Canadian journalist and writer on urban planning.

Jane Jacobs may also refer to:
Jane Jacobs (baseball) (1924–2015), American baseball player
Jane M. Jacobs (born 1958), Australian cultural geographer and academic

See also
 Jacobs (surname)
 Jacobs (disambiguation)